The 1988–89 World Series was a One Day International (ODI) cricket tri-series where Australia played host to Pakistan and West Indies. Australia and West Indies reached the Finals, which West Indies won 2–1.

Points Table

Result summary

Final series
West Indies won the best of three final series against Australia 2–1.

This match led to Australia's development of a replacement to the Average Run Rate method, which became the Most Productive Overs method.

References

Australian Tri-Series
1988 in Australian cricket
1988 in Pakistani cricket
1988–89 Australian cricket season
1989 in Australian cricket
1989 in Pakistani cricket
International cricket competitions from 1988–89 to 1991
1988–89
1988–89